Harrison is a common patronymic surname of Northern English origin. It means "son of Harry" or "Herry", representing the Middle English pronunciation of the given name Henry. It was in use by the 14th century. It may also be spelt Harrisson, Harryson or Harrysson. Henrison also appears historically but is now rare. Early records suggest that the surnames Harrison and Harris were used interchangeably by some families.

Distribution

United Kingdom
For the latest available census data from 2011, the UK government did not generate a list of surname frequencies.

United States
For the latest available census data from 2010, Harrison ranked as the 141st most common surname in the US with 181,091 entries, and Harris ranked as the 25th most common surname in the US with 624,252 entries.

Surname
Notable people with the surname Harrison include:

Harrison (baseball) (first name unknown) (fl. 1901), American baseball player

A
Abi Harrison (born 1997), Scottish footballer
Adlene Harrison (1923–2022), American politician
Ælfric Harrison (1889–1958), English cricketer
Albert Harrison (disambiguation), multiple people
Albertis Sydney Harrison Jr. (1907–1995), American politician and jurist
Alistair Harrison (born 1954) British diplomat and former Governor of Anguilla
Alvin Harrison (born 1974), American athlete
Andrew Harrison (disambiguation), multiple people
Ann Harrison (disambiguation), multiple people
Anna Harrison (1775–1864), wife of U.S. president William Henry Harrison
Annie Harrison (disambiguation), multiple people
Arthur Harrison (disambiguation), multiple people
Ashley Harrison (born 1981), Australian rugby league player
Audley Harrison (born 1971), British boxer

B
Ben Harrison (disambiguation), multiple people
Benjamin Harrison (disambiguation), multiple people and 23rd president of America 
Bret Harrison (born 1982), American actor
Brian Harrison (disambiguation), multiple people

C
Caroline Harrison (1832–1892), wife of U.S. president Benjamin Harrison
Carter Harrison (disambiguation), multiple people
Catherine Harrison (disambiguation), multiple people
Charles Harrison (disambiguation), multiple people
Charlie Harrison (disambiguation), multiple people
Christopher Harrison (disambiguation), multiple people
Colin Harrison (disambiguation), multiple people
Constance Cary Harrison (1843–1920; pen name, "Refugitta"), American writer
Craig Harrison (disambiguation), multiple people
Cynthia Harrison (born 1946)
Cyril Harrison (cricketer) (1915–1998), English cricketer

D
Damon Harrison (born 1988), American football player
D'Angelo Harrison (born 1993), American basketball player
Daniel Harrison (disambiguation), multiple people
Danny Harrison (disambiguation), multiple people
David Harrison (disambiguation), multiple people
Derrick Harrison (1929–1967), rugby league footballer of the 1950s
Desmond Harrison (American football) (born 1993), American football player
Dhani Harrison (born 1978), English musician; son of George Harrison of Beatles fame

E
Earl G. Harrison (1899–1955), American dean of the University of Pennsylvania Law School; commissioner of the United States Immigration and Naturalization Service
E. Hunter Harrison (1944–2017), railroad executive in the US and Canada 
Edward Harrison (disambiguation), multiple people
E. J. Harrison (disambiguation), multiple people
Elizabeth Harrison (disambiguation), multiple people
Ellie Harrison (disambiguation), multiple people
Ellis Harrison (born 1994), English footballer
Eric Harrison (disambiguation), multiple people

F
Fairfax Harrison (1869–1938), American railroad executive and writer
Francis Harrison (disambiguation), multiple people
Fred Harrison (disambiguation), multiple people

G
Gabriel Harrison (1818–1902), American photographer and actor 
Gary Harrison, American songwriter
Gavin Harrison (born 1963), British drummer
George Harrison (disambiguation), multiple people
Gessner Harrison (1807–1862), American professor of classical languages
Gilbert Harrison (disambiguation), multiple people
Glynn Harrison (born 1954), American football player
Gregory Harrison (born 1950), American actor

H
Hardbody Harrison (born 1966), former professional wrestler, toughman competitor and convicted felon
Harry Harrison (disambiguation), multiple people
H. C. A. Harrison (1836–1929), Australian football pioneer
Henry Harrison (disambiguation), multiple people
Herbert C. Harrison (1876–1927), Developer of the modern automobile radiator
Herm Harrison (1939–2013), Canadian football tight end 
Hubert Harrison (1883–1927), American writer and activist

I
Ian Harrison (disambiguation), multiple people

J
J. Hartwell Harrison (1909–1984), American premier transplant surgeon
Jack Harrison (disambiguation), multiple people
James Harrison (disambiguation), multiple people
Jane Harrison (disambiguation), multiple people
Jay Harrison (born 1982), Canadian ice hockey player
Jenilee Harrison (born 1959), American actress
Jerry Harrison (born 1949), American musician
Jessica Harrison (disambiguation), multiple people
Joan Harrison (disambiguation), multiple people
Joe Harrison (disambiguation), multiple people
John Harrison (disambiguation), multiple people
Jonotthan Harrison (born 1991), American football player
Joseph Harrison (disambiguation), multiple people
Josh Harrison (born 1987), American baseball player

K
Kayla Harrison (born 1990), American judoka
Ken Harrison (disambiguation), multiple people
Kendra Harrison (born 1992), American track and field athlete
Kenny Harrison (born 1965), American track and field athlete
Kevin Harrison (born 1981), American football player

L
Larry Harrison (disambiguation), multiple people
Lee Harrison (disambiguation), multiple people
Leigh Harrison (disambiguation), multiple people
Leo Harrison (1922–2016), English cricketer
Les Harrison (basketball) (1904–1997), American basketball player, coach, and team owner
Liam Harrison (disambiguation), multiple people
Linda Harrison (born 1945), American actress
Lou Harrison (1917–2003), American composer
Lowell H. Harrison (1922–2011), American historian specializing in Kentucky
Lyndon Harrison, Baron Harrison (born 1947), British Labour Party politician

M
Malik Harrison (born 1998), American football player
Marion Harrison (born 1946), Welsh wheelchair curler
Mark Harrison (disambiguation), multiple people
Mark Simon Harrison (born 1960), British footballer
Martin Harrison (disambiguation), multiple people
Martez Harrison (born 1993), American basketball player
Marvin Harrison (born 1972), American football player
Marvin Harrison Jr. (born 2002), American football player
Maurice Harrison-Gray (1899–1968), British bridge player
Mary Harrison (disambiguation), multiple people
Matthew Harrison (disambiguation), multiple people
Michael Harrison (disambiguation), multiple people
Michelle Harrison (actress), American television and film actress
Michelle Harrison (writer) (born 1979), British writer
Molly Harrison (1909–2002), English museum curator and author
Monte Harrison (born 1995), American football and baseball player
Moses Harrison (1932–2013), American jurist
M. John Harrison (born 1945), British writer

N
Nigel Harrison (born 1951), British guitarist
Noel Harrison (1934–2013), English singer, actor, and Olympic skier

O
Olivia Harrison (born 1948), Mexican author and film producer

P
Pat Harrison (1881–1941), American politician
Paul Harrison (disambiguation), multiple people
Peter Harrison (disambiguation), multiple people
Phil Harrison (disambiguation), multiple people

Q
Queen Harrison (born 1988), American track and field athlete

R
Randy Harrison (born 1977), American actor
Rex Harrison (1908–1990), British actor
Richard Harrison (disambiguation), multiple people
Rob Harrison (disambiguation), multiple people
Robert Harrison (disambiguation), multiple people
Rodney Harrison (born 1972), American football player
Ronnie Harrison (born 1997), American football player
Ross Granville Harrison (1870–1959), American biologist
Russell Benjamin Harrison (1854–1936), American lawyer and politician
Ruth Harrison (snooker player) (1909–1991), English snooker and billiards player
Ruth Harrison (1920–2000), British animal welfare activist and writer
Ryan Harrison (disambiguation), multiple people

S
Sam Harrison (disambiguation), multiple people
Samuel Harrison (disambiguation), multiple people
Sarah Harrison (disambiguation), multiple people
Scott Harrison (disambiguation), multiple people
Sidney Harrison (1903–1986), British pianist, composer and broadcaster
Simon Harrison, (born 1969), British racing driver
Sol Harrison (1917–1989), American comic book editor and publisher
Steve Harrison (disambiguation), multiple people

T
Terry Harrison (disambiguation), multiple people
Thelma Akana Harrison, American politician
Thomas Harrison (disambiguation), multiple people
Tony Harrison (disambiguation), multiple people
Tristia Harrison (born 1973), British businesswoman, CEO of TalkTalk Group

V
Vashti Harrison (born 1988), American writer and filmmaker

W
Wallace Harrison (1895–1981), American architect
Wayne Harrison (disambiguation), multiple people
Wilbert Harrison (1929–1994), American singer
William Harrison (disambiguation), multiple people
William Henry Harrison (1773–1841), ninth president of the United States
William Jerome Harrison (1845–1908), British geologist and photographer

Z
Zach Harrison (born 2001), American football player

Given name
Harrison Allen (1841–1897), American physician and anatomist
Harrison Allen (general) (1835–1904), Union Army brevet brigadier general
Harrison Afful (born 1986), Ghanaian football player
Harrison Bader (born 1994), American baseball player
Harrison Barnes (born 1992), NBA player
Harrison Birtwistle (1934–2022), British composer
Harrison Bryant (born 1998), American football player
Harrison Burton (born 2000), American racing driver
Harrison Butker (born 1995), American football player
Harrison Cady (1877–1970), American illustrator
Harrison Craig (born 1994), Australian singer
Harrison Dillard (1923–2019), American track athlete
Harrison Gray Dyar (1805–1875), American inventor
Harrison Ford (silent film actor) (1884–1957), American stage and cinema actor
Harrison Ford (born 1942), American actor
Harrison J. Freebourn (1890–1954), Justice of the Montana Supreme Court
Harrison Hand (born 1998), American football player
Harrison Ingram (born 2002), American basketball player
Harrison Marks (1926–1997), British photographer
Harrison McCain (1927–2004), Canadian businessman
Harrison Gray Otis (publisher) (1837–1917), American publisher
Harrison Page (born 1941), American actor
Harrison Phillips (born 1996), American football player
Harrison Reed (politician) (1813–1899), American politician
Harrison Rhodes (born 1993), American racing driver
Harrison Salisbury (1908–1993), American journalist
Harrison Schmitt (born 1935), American astronaut and politician
Harrison Smith (disambiguation), multiple people
Harrison Storms (1915–1992), American aeronautical engineer
Harrison Ruffin Tyler (born 1928), American chemical engineer, businessperson, and preservationist
Harrison H. Wheeler (1839–1896), American politician from Michigan
Harrison White (born 1930), American sociologist
Harrison Wilson Jr. (1925–2019), American educator and college basketball coach
Harrison Young (1930–2005), American actor

Middle name
Joshua Harrison Bruce (1833–1891), American farmer and politician

First name
Harrison J. Peck (1842–1913), American newspaper editor and politician
 Harrison "Harry" Swartz (born 1996), American soccer player

Fictional characters
Harrison Bergeron, title character in a short story by Kurt Vonnegut
Harrison Wells, the name of several characters in the CW series The Flash
John Harrison, pseudonym used by Khan Noonien Singh in Star Trek Into Darkness
Jude Harrison, musician in the television series Instant Star
Steve Harrison (character), detective created by Robert E. Howard
Tony Harrison, shaman in the television series The Mighty Boosh
Harrison, a character in the 1997 film The Second Jungle Book: Mowgli & Baloo

See also

Francis Harison (died 1740), colonial New York lawyer
Harrison family of Virginia
Richard Harison (1748–1829), New York lawyer
Tom Harrisson (1911–1976), ethnologist and World War II guerilla fighter

References

Masculine given names
English masculine given names
English-language surnames
Surnames of English origin
Patronymic surnames